Hugh Miller Foley (March 3, 1944 – November 9, 2016) was an American rower. Competing in the eights he won an Olympic gold medal in 1964 and a bronze medal at the 1965 European Championships. He also won a gold in the coxed fours at the 1967 Pan American Games. During his career, Foley won a total of six national titles in the fours and eights.

Foley was born in Seattle, but was raised in Martin City, Montana, where his father worked as a forester and a farmer. In 1962, Foley enrolled to Loyola Marymount University in Los Angeles, but then transferred to La Salle University in Philadelphia, graduating in 1966 in accounting. He joined the Vesper Boat Club there around 1963. He remained active in rowing after retiring from competitions, and coached at Boston University in the 1970s, but later became a financial advisor in Eugene, Oregon. His Olympic medal was stolen from his home in 1996, but was recovered by the police.

References

Cited sources

External links

 

1944 births
2016 deaths
Rowers at the 1964 Summer Olympics
Olympic gold medalists for the United States in rowing
American male rowers
Medalists at the 1964 Summer Olympics
Pan American Games medalists in rowing
Pan American Games gold medalists for the United States
Rowers at the 1967 Pan American Games
European Rowing Championships medalists
Medalists at the 1967 Pan American Games